Brett William Austin (26 May 1959 – 9 December 1989) was a breaststroke swimmer who represented New Zealand at the 1984 Summer Olympics and the 1982 Commonwealth Games. He died in 1989.

References

External links
 
 

1959 births
1989 deaths
Swimmers at the 1984 Summer Olympics
Olympic swimmers of New Zealand
New Zealand male breaststroke swimmers
Swimmers from Auckland
20th-century New Zealand people